David John Busst (born 30 June 1967) is an English football manager and formerly professional player who played as a centre-back from 1991 until 1996. 

Having started his career with non-League Moor Green, he moved to Premier League side Coventry City in August 1992. Having made over 50 appearances for the Sky Blues, he suffered a broken leg during a match with Manchester United in 1996 which ended his career. His injury is often considered as the most horrific in the history of the Premier League. 

He moved into management following his retirement with Solihull Borough in 2001, and later took charge of Evesham United. He came out of retirement in 2008 as defensive cover for Highgate United.

Early life
Busst was born in Birmingham, West Midlands.

Club career
Busst played as a defender, and started his career at non-League side Moor Green in Birmingham, before moving to Premier League side Coventry City in August 1992. He made his professional debut in an FA Cup match against Norwich City on 13 January 1993, and his Premier League debut three days later against the same side. Busst made ten league appearances in his first professional season, and went on to make 50 league appearances in total for the club, scoring 4 goals.

Injury
His professional playing career came to an end on 8 April 1996, whilst playing for Coventry against Manchester United. Two minutes into the match, having ventured forward after his team won a corner, Busst collided with United players Denis Irwin and Brian McClair, resulting in extensive compound fractures to both the tibia and fibula of his right leg. The match had to be delayed for nine minutes, due to Busst needing to be removed from the field on a stretcher, and blood was cleaned off the grass with water and sand. Manchester United's goalkeeper Peter Schmeichel vomited on the pitch upon seeing the injury. It was rumoured that Schmeichel had counselling for the effect of seeing the injury, but he said that this was not so. The injury is often cited as one of the worst in the history of football. The subsequent injuries suffered by Eduardo da Silva, Luc Nilis and Preston Burpo have been compared to Busst's injury by many observers, though Busst's is generally considered as by far the worst.

Busst's injuries were so bad that at one point he ran the risk of having his leg amputated. While in hospital, Busst contracted MRSA, which caused further damage to the tissue and muscle in the injured part of his leg. Despite having 22 operations, Busst remained a member of the official Coventry squad for a further seven months, but never played professionally again, and he retired from the game on 6 November 1996 on medical advice, as his doctors had warned him that he would never regain full fitness to play professional football. It was not the break itself that ended his career, but the following infections. Just weeks before his retirement, Busst had been hoping to return to training the following spring and be ready for first team action by the start of the 1997–98 season.

His testimonial match, played on 16 May 1997 against Manchester United, was a sell-out. England internationals Paul Gascoigne and Les Ferdinand guested for Coventry in the game, which was also notable for being the last game that United captain Eric Cantona played before he announced his retirement as a player two days later.

Coaching career
Since his retirement, he has worked for Coventry's backroom staff, working for their Football in the Community programme, of which he became director. A year after the testimonial match, Schmeichel bumped into Busst at Old Trafford and they had a long chat; Busst said that he was happy, working with kids in Coventry.

Busst also trained as a coach, earning UEFA coaching badges. Busst went on to manage the non-League sides Solihull Borough (from 2000 until 2003) and Evesham United (from 2003 to 2006.) He briefly acted as defensive cover in 2008 for Midland Combination Premier Division side Highgate United, where his brother Paul was the club's assistant manager.

Notes
A. : Some sources, such as 11v11, and Soccerbase, give his transfer date as being January 1992, not August, which would mean he joined Coventry whilst they were still in the Football League First Division.

References

1967 births
Living people
Footballers from Birmingham, West Midlands
English footballers
Association football defenders
Moor Green F.C. players
Coventry City F.C. players
Highgate United F.C. players
Premier League players
English football managers
Evesham United F.C. managers